Arandu is a town in Skardu District, Gilgit-Baltistan.

References

External links

Valleys of Gilgit-Baltistan
Populated places in Skardu District
Baltistan